The Xingu screech owl (Megascops stangiae) is a species of owl in the family Strigidae. It is found only in the Tapajos-Xingu and Xingu-Tocantins of Brazil. The holotype was collected in Serra dos Carajás. It is closely related to tawny-bellied screech owl in both morphology and genetics, but could be differed by its longer song pace.

This species was described in 2021, and thus recognized in Avibase taxonomic concepts.

Reference

Megascops
Birds of Brazil
Birds described in 2021